Texas Proposition 6 may refer to various ballot measures in Texas, including:

2007 Texas Proposition 6
2021 Texas Proposition 6